The Condes de Argillo Palace (Spanish: Palacio de los Condes de Argillo) is a historical building in Morata de Jalón, Aragon, Spain. 

It was built in 1672-1676 under the direction of Juan de la Marca.

It has an H-shaped plan, with a large central volume prolonged by two transversal wings at its ends, the left one corresponding to the church of Santa Ana. It has a brickwork façade.

See also
List of Bien de Interés Cultural landmarks in the Province of Zaragoza

Palaces in Aragon
Houses completed in 1676
Baroque architecture in Aragon
Bien de Interés Cultural landmarks in the Province of Zaragoza
1676 establishments in Spain